AstroLabs is a Dubai-based digital capability building company & Google for Startups (GFS) co-working space member of the GFS Tech Hub Network, with offices in Riyadh and Beirut.

Overview
AstroLabs is the first tech hub that is partnered with Google in Dubai, United Arab Emirates (UAE). Network members have access to over twenty hubs in various cities in the world, and can also meet with local entrepreneurs. The work space is located in Dubai's Jumeirah Lakes Towers neighborhood. AstroLabs was founded in 2012 by Louis Lebbos & Muhammed Mekki, co-founders of Namshi.com. The company launched in March 2013.

In 2016, AstroLabs hosted the Women in STEM (WiSTEM) Hackathon, among 328 other public community events.

In 2020, Astrolabs has launched its first the Set Up in Saudi Platform, on how businesses can set up a 100% foreign-owned entity in the Kingdom.
AstroLabs has inspired the formation of technology-based businesses in the area.

Company name
The company's name is based upon the astrolabe, a tool for navigation that was used by mariners in the Middle Ages.

References

Further reading
 "Aiming to Educate Middle East Entrepreneurs, Astrolabs Takes Off". Wharton School of the University of Pennsylvania. May 28, 2013.

External links
 
 Astrolabs at Google for Entrepreneurs

Google
Companies based in Dubai